Joseph Anthony Ball (born 4 June 1947) is an American mathematician who is currently a professor emeritus  at the Virginia Polytechnic Institute and State University, often referred to as Virginia Tech. He is a 2019 fellow of the American Mathematical Society for contributions to operator theory, analytic functions, and service to the profession.

He was awarded Bachelor of Science from Georgetown University in 1969. He obtained his Master of Science in 1970 and Doctor of Philosophy in 1973 both from the University of Virginia, Charlottesville. The title of his doctoral dissertation is "Unitary Perturbations of
Contractions", supervised by Marvin Rosenblum. According to current Mathematics Genealogy Project database, Ball has 12 students and 18 descendants.

References

1947 births
Living people
20th-century American mathematicians
21st-century American mathematicians
Virginia Tech faculty
Georgetown University alumni
University of Virginia alumni